Cheshire is a county in the northwest of England. 

Cheshire may also refer to:

Places in the United States
Cheshire, Connecticut
Cheshire, Massachusetts
Cheshire (CDP), Massachusetts, a census-designated place
Cheshire, Ohio, a village in Gallia County
Cheshire, Delaware County, Ohio, an unincorporated community
Cheshire, Oregon
Cheshire County, New Hampshire
Cheshire Township, Michigan
Cheshire Township, Gallia County, Ohio

Other
 Cheshire (comics), a villain in DC Comics
 Cheshire (passenger train), a named passenger train operated by the Boston & Maine railroad
 Cheshire (South), a former regional English rugby union league
 Cheshire (surname), a list of people with the name
 Cheshire cheese, a traditional cheese produced in Cheshire, England
 HMS Cheshire, a ship of the British Royal Navy 1927–1957
 Cheshire (EP), 2022 release from Itzy
 "Cheshire" (song), 2022 song by Itzy

See also
 Cheshire Bridge (disambiguation)
 Cheshire Cat (disambiguation)